Javier Cámara Rodríguez (born 19 January 1967) is a Spanish actor.

He became known for two television roles as a priest in ¡Ay, señor, señor! and Éste es mi barrio. He has since featured in films such as Torrente, the Dumb Arm of the Law (which earned him wide public recognition in Spain), Talk to Her, Torremolinos 73, Living Is Easy with Eyes Closed, Truman and Forgotten We'll Be.

Other television credits include performances in series such as 7 vidas, The Young Pope and The New Pope (portraying a cleric again) or Narcos, likewise starring as the title character in the Juan Carrasco politico-satirical saga (Vota Juan, Vamos Juan and Venga Juan).

Early life
Javier Cámara Rodríguez was born on 19 January 1967 in Albelda de Iregua, province of Logroño. He trained his acting chops at the theatre group of IES Laboral (his high school) and the Logroño's Theatre School, later moving to Madrid to train at the RESAD.

Career

Following his two first major television roles (as a priest) that made him known, in ¡Ay, Señor, Señor! (1994–1995), portraying Father Ángel Murillo and Éste es mi barrio (1996–1997), portraying Don Justo, he earned wide public visibility in Spain with his performance in 1998 dark comedy film and box-office hit Torrente, el brazo tonto de la ley, portraying Rafi, the sidekick of antihero José Luis Torrente, earning a nomination to the Goya Award for Best New Actor.

Filmography

Film

Television

Accolades 

|-
| align = "center" | 1999 ||  || Best New Actor || Torrente, the Dumb Arm of the Law ||  || align = "center" | 
|-
| align = "center" rowspan = "2" | 2002 || rowspan  ="2" |  || Best Actor || rowspan = "3" | Talk to Her ||  || rowspan = "2" | 
|-
| People's Choice Award for Best Actor || 
|-
| align = "center" | 2003 ||  || Best Actor ||  || 
|-
| align = "center" | 2004 ||  || Best Actor || Torremolinos 73 ||  || 
|-
| align = "center" rowspan = "3" | 2006 ||  || Best Supporting Actor || The Secret Life of Words ||  || 
|-
| rowspan = "2" |  || Best Film Actor in a Leading Role || Malas temporadas ||  || align = "center" rowspan = "2" | 
|-
| Best Film Actor in a Minor Role || The Secret Life of Words || 
|-
| align = "center" | 2009 ||  || Best Actor || Chef's Special ||  || 
|-
| align = "center" rowspan = "2" | 2014 ||  || Best Actor || rowspan = "2" | Living Is Easy with Eyes Closed ||  || 
|-
|  || Best Actor ||  || 
|-
| align = "center" | 2015 ||  || Best Actor || The Unexpected Life ||  || 
|-
| align = "center" rowspan = "5" | 2016 ||  || Best Actor || rowspan = "5" | Truman ||  || 
|-
|  || Best Actor ||  || 
|-
|  || Best Supporting Actor ||  || 
|-
|  || Best Film Actor in a Secondary Role ||  || 
|-
|  || Best Actor ||  || 
|-
| align = "center" rowspan = "2" | 2020 ||  || Best Television Actor in a Leading Role || rowspan = "2" | Vota Juan ||  || 
|-
|  || Best Actor in a Miniseries or TV series ||  || 
|-
| align = "center" rowspan = "4" | 2021 || rowspan = "2" |  || Best Film Actor || The People Upstairs ||  || rowspan = "2" | 
|-
| Best Television Actor || Vamos Juan || 
|-
|  || Best Actor || Forgotten We'll Be ||  || 
|-
|  || Best Actor in a TV Series || rowspan = "4" | Venga Juan ||  || 
|-
| align = "center" rowspan = "4" | 2022 ||  || Best Main Actor in a TV Series ||  || 
|-
|  || Best Television Actor in a Leading Role ||  || 
|-
|  || Best Actor in a Miniseries or TV series ||  || 
|-
|  || Best Television Actor || rowspan = "2" | Rapa ||  || 
|-
| align = "center" | 2023 ||  || Best Actor in a TV Series ||  || align = "center" | 
|}

References

External links

1967 births
Living people
European Film Awards winners (people)
Spanish male film actors
People from La Rioja
Spanish male television actors
20th-century Spanish male actors
21st-century Spanish male actors